Stevie Thomas (born July 24, 1967) is a former Arena football wide receiver/linebacker in the Arena Football League (AFL). He played college football at Bethune-Cookman University. 

In 2011, Thomas was elected into the Arena Football Hall of Fame.

Since 2021, Thomas has been the head coach for the indoor football team the Tampa Bay Tornadoes.

References

1967 births
Living people
American football wide receivers
American football linebackers
Bethune–Cookman Wildcats football players
Tampa Bay Storm players
Orlando Predators players
New Jersey Gladiators players